Denise Bosc (July 19, 1916 – March 9, 2002) was a French film actress. She starred in the 1946 film The Sea Rose.

Filmography

References

Bibliography
 Goble, Alan. The Complete Index to Literary Sources in Film. Walter de Gruyter, 1999.

External links

1916 births
2002 deaths
French film actresses
Actresses from Paris
20th-century French actresses